Martín Jaite was the defending champion, but did not compete this year.

Miloslav Mečíř won the title by defeating Jan Gunnarsson 6–0, 6–2 in the final.

Seeds
All seeds received a bye into the second round.

Draw

Finals

Top half

Section 1

Section 2

Bottom half

Section 3

Section 4

References

External links
 Official results archive (ATP)
 Official results archive (ITF)

Stuttgart Singles
Singles 1987